WTM may refer to:

Wellington Tramway Museum
World Tamil Movement
World Travel Market
World Travel Monitor